Karasu (Kara-Suv) is a rural locality (a selo) and the administrative centre of Karasuvsky Selsoviet, Nogaysky District, Republic of Dagestan, Russia. The population was 761 as of 2010. There are 7 streets.

Geography 
Karasu is located 10 km southeast of Terekli-Mekteb (the district's administrative centre) by road. Terekli-Mekteb and Kalininaul are the nearest rural localities.

Nationalities 
Nogais live there.

References 

Rural localities in Nogaysky District, Dagestan